Pocomoke City, dubbed "the friendliest town on the Eastern Shore", is a city in Worcester County, Maryland, United States. Although renamed in a burst of civic enthusiasm in 1878, the city is regularly referred to by its inhabitants simply as Pocomoke . The population was 4,184 at the 2010 census. It is part of the Salisbury, Maryland-Delaware Metropolitan Statistical Area.  Pocomoke City is a center for commerce on the lower shore, home to an industrial park currently playing host to defense contractors, aerospace engineering, and plastics fabrication. Pocomoke City is located near the Wallops Island Flight Facility in Wallops Island, Virginia.

History

Beginning in the late seventeenth century, a small settlement called Stevens Landing (sometimes Stevens Ferry) grew at the ferry landing on the south bank of the Pocomoke River. The town was incorporated as Newtown (or New Town) in 1865, but was reincorporated in 1878 as Pocomoke City, after the American Indian name of the river, meaning "black water."

Stevens Landing, and then Newtown, remained a modest river crossing until the construction through the town in the 1880s of the trunk railroad line along the Delmarva Peninsula from Wilmington, Delaware, to Cape Charles on the Eastern Shore of Virginia. The line eventually became part of the Pennsylvania Railroad. In addition to agriculture, industry such as lumber milling and shipbuilding and, in the twentieth century, factories making barrels and baskets for truck crops, and the canning of those crops, aided the town's growth.

In 1922, the business district of Pocomoke City was destroyed in a large fire; on one side of town this continued up to the church on third Street, known as St. Mary's Episcopal Church, but the downtown was quickly rebuilt. While truck farming declined during the 1900s, the poultry industry rose to take its place. NASA, the U.S. Navy, and the Coast Guard helped with continued growth by bringing jobs to the area. 

Pocomoke City was named an All-America City by the National Municipal League, and for the years 1984–85, Pocomoke City was one of the nine Finalist Communities.

Culture

Historic locations
The Sturgis One Room School Museum, a one-room schoolhouse, was moved to its present location in the downtown area as a museum of local African-American history. In addition to the MarVa Theater and Costen House, Beverly, Littleton T. Clarke House, Crockett House, Hayward's Lott, Pocomoke City Historic District, Puncheon Mill House, and Young-Sartorius House are listed on the National Register of Historic Places.

Museums and arts
Pocomoke City is home to the Delmarva Discovery Museum, an interactive museum focusing on local ecology and history, and The Isaac Costen House Museum. The MarVa Theater is a 1927 Art Deco auditorium known for its superior acoustics, and is being restored as a regional center for the performing arts.

Sports
In the past, Pocomoke City held a franchise in the Eastern Shore Baseball League, at times hosting the Salamanders, the Red Sox, and the Chicks.

Notable murders
On June 14, 1906, the city was the site of a lynching. A farmhand named Edd Watson was murdered by a mob.

In October 1933, George Armwood, a Pocomoke City man was taken from a jail cell in nearby Princess Anne and killed by a mob.

Education
Three Worcester County Public Schools are located in Pocomoke City: Pocomoke Elementary, Pocomoke Middle, and Pocomoke High.  Both the elementary and high schools are named a Blue Ribbon School.

Geography
Pocomoke City is located at  (38.068904, -75.561718).

Climate
Its climate is characterized by hot and humid stretches of weather in summer, but they are often broken up by cold fronts from the north offering several days of mild temperatures. Both spring and fall are pleasant with cool to mild temperatures and lower humidity. Winters are relatively mild compared to areas to the north and northwest, but cold spells send temperatures well below freezing. Tropical storms occasionally impact the region during summer and fall.

The Köppen climate classification subtype for this climate is "Cfa" (Humid Subtropical Climate).

Municipal status
References to the municipality's status as a city or town varies according to sources. The Census Bureau accounts Pocomoke City a city, while official state documents differ. According to the Maryland State Archives, many more official documents refer to the "Town of Pocomoke City" than to the "City of Pocomoke City." The most recent references to the "Town" are from 1963, however, while the most recent references to the "City", which come from its Charter, are from 1990. Other sources also differ: the Maryland Manual Online calls it as a city, while the Maryland Municipal League speaks of it as a town. While cities and towns are significantly different in some states, Maryland's cities and towns, classed simply as "municipalities", are treated equally in state law.

Demographics

2000 census
As of the census of 2000, there were 4,098 people, 1,596 households, and 1,058 families living in the city. The racial makeup of the city was 50.73% White, 46.36% African American, 0.46% Native American, 0.46% Asian, 0.02% Pacific Islander, 0.34% from other races, and 1.61% from two or more races. Hispanic or Latino of any race were 1.05% of the population.

There were 1,596 households, out of which 35.8% had children under the age of 18 living with them, 38.6% were married couples living together, 24.0% had a female householder with no husband present, and 33.7% were non-families. 29.9% of all households were made up of individuals, and 16.8% had someone living alone who was 65 years of age or older. The average household size was 2.51 and the average family size was 3.11.

In the city, the age distribution of the population shows 30.5% under the age of 18, 7.8% from 18 to 24, 26.7% from 25 to 44, 19.1% from 45 to 64, and 16.0% who were 65 years of age or older. The median age was 36 years. For every 100 females, there were 83.6 males. For every 100 females age 18 and over, there were 74.7 males.

The median income for a household in the city was $28,938, and the median income for a family was $34,722. Males had a median income of $32,175 versus $19,362 for females. The per capita income for the city was $17,301. About 13.6% of families and 18.3% of the population were below the poverty line, including 31.8% of those under age 18 and 13.2% of those age 65 or over.

2010 census
As of the census of 2010, there were 4,184 people, 1,626 households, and 1,077 families living in the city. The racial makeup of the city was 49.5% White, 45.8% African American, 0.5% Native American, 1.3% Asian, 1.0% from other races, and 2.0% from two or more races. Hispanic or Latino of any race were 2.5% of the population.

There were 1,626 households, of which 38.7% had children under the age of 18 living with them, 35.5% were married couples living together, 24.9% had a female householder with no husband present, 5.8% had a male householder with no wife present, and 33.8% were non-families. 29.6% of all households were made up of individuals, and 14% had someone living alone who was 65 years of age or older. The average household size was 2.52 and the average family size was 3.10.

The median age in the city was 36.4 years. 27.8% of residents were under the age of 18; 9.2% were between the ages of 18 and 24; 23.4% were from 25 to 44; 24.4% were from 45 to 64; and 15.2% were 65 years of age or older. The gender makeup of the city was 55.6% female and 44.4% male.

Notable people

George Armwood, victim of last recorded lynching in Maryland lived in Pocomoke City.
Hugh Latimer Dryden, director of NACA (1947–1958) and Deputy Administrator of NASA (1958-1965) was born in Pocomoke City.

Controversy 
Pocomoke City was the subject of a 2019 documentary, The Friendliest Town, which investigated the abrupt and unexplained firing in 2015 of the town's first Black police chief, Kelvin Sewell. Sewell subsequently filed suit in federal court together with former lieutenant Lynell Green and former detective Franklin Savage, alleging a pattern of "rampant racial discrimination and retaliation" by city, county, and state officials. In 2019, Pocomoke City agreed to settle Sewell and Green's federal lawsuits, and the town entered a consent decree requiring it to reform its policies and procedures around policing.

References

Further reading
 Murray, James, History of Pocomoke City, formerly New Town (1883).
 Torrence, Clayton, Old Somerset on the Eastern Shore of Maryland (1935).
 Touart, Paul Baker, Along the Seaboard Side: And Architectural History of Worcester County (1994).
 Truitt, Reginald V. & Millard Lescallette, Worcester County, Maryland's Arcadia (1977).

External links

 Pocomoke City Chamber of Commerce website
 

 
Cities in Maryland
Cities in Worcester County, Maryland
Salisbury metropolitan area